Tønder is a town in the Region of Southern Denmark. With a population of 7,505 (as of 1 January 2022), it is the main town and the administrative seat of the Tønder Municipality.

History
The first mention of Tønder might have been in the mid-12th century, when the Arab geographer Muhammad al-Idrisi mentioned the landmark Tu(r)ndira, which might have been a reference to either Tønder, or the nearby town of Møgeltønder.

Tønder was granted port privileges by the Hanseatic League in 1243, making it Denmark's oldest privileged market town. In 1532 it was hit by severe floods, with water levels reaching 1.8 m in St Laurent's church, 5.3 m above sea level. In the 1550s, Tønder's port lost direct access to the sea due to dykes being built to the west of town at the direction of Duke Hans the Elder of Schleswig-Holstein-Haderslev, the son of Frederick I of Denmark.

The town centre is dominated by houses from the late 17th and early 18th century, when the town experienced rapid growth as a result of its lace industry. Prior to 1864, Tønder was situated in the Duchy of Schleswig, so its history is intertwined with the contentious history of Schleswig-Holstein. In the 1920s, when the Schleswig Plebiscite incorporated Northern Schleswig into Denmark, 76.5% of Tønder's inhabitants voted to remain part of Germany and 23.5% voted to join Denmark.

During World War I, a Zeppelin base was operated in Tønder by the Imperial German Navy. The base was attacked by the British on 19 July 1918, in what is known as the Tondern raid. Seven Sopwith Camels from the aircraft carrier  bombed the base, hitting two of the three airship hangars. The Zeppelins L.54 and L.60 inside one hangar were destroyed and a balloon inside the other was damaged. After this, Tønder was abandoned as an active airship base, and was used only as an emergency landing site. A wartime aircraft hangar survives, as do some of the ancillary buildings, but only the foundations remain of the large airship hangars. The site now houses a museum, named the Zeppelin and Garrison Museum Tønder.

After the First World War, Tønder was detached from Germany, in spite of the majority of its population casting a pro-German vote in the Schleswig Plebiscites - as Tønder was included in Zone I, which as a whole had a strong pro-Danish majority.  In the years that followed, German political parties enjoyed a majority in the city council, and until 1945, the city was officially bilingual.

After the end of the German occupation of Denmark, the political influence of the German population dwindled considerably. In spite of the improvement in cross-border traffic, the location of the town continued to hamper industrial growth through the late 20th century, although some companies did set up businesses. Tourism has grown in importance. In 1989, Tønder Seminarium, the oldest teacher training college in Scandinavia, established in 1788, was closed.

Attractions

Every August, the Tønder Festival offers visitors a wide variety of traditional and modern folk music. The Scouts of Tønder are twinned with Hemyock, in Devon, England, and make exchange trips between the countries every few years.

Marriage 
As Tønder is the first town over the border in Denmark from Germany, the town has been a particularly popular place to elope since the 1960s. This is especially true for couples of mixed-nationalities, particularly between Europeans citizens and non-European citizens. This is due in part to Denmark's liberal marriage laws, compared to those in nearby Germany which requires a minimum of three months' administration and the ceremony has to be in German. However, in Denmark it can be done in just around a week, with fewer documents required and the vows can be done in languages other than the national language. In 2007, over 2,500 marriages were done at Tønder town hall by non-resident couples compared to just 150 local couples.

Notable people from Tønder

Public Service, Science & Business 

 Oluf Gerhard Tychsen (1734–1815) a German Orientalist and Hebrew scholar, a founding father of Islamic numismatics
 Johan Christian Fabricius (1745–1808) a Danish zoologist, specialising in "Insecta", arthropods: insects, arachnids and crustaceans.
 Georg Zoëga (1755 in Daler–1809) a scientist, archaeologist, numismatist and anthropologist
 Nicolai Andresen (1781–1861) a Norwegian merchant, banker and member of Stortinget
 Peter Andreas Hansen (1795 in Tønder–1874) a Danish-born German astronomer 
 Julius Bahnsen (1830–1881) a German philosopher, originator of characterology 
 Gustav Adolf Neuber (1850–1932) a German surgeon
 Bernhard M. Jacobsen (1862–1936) emigrated 1876, became a U.S. Representative from Iowa
 Captain Max Valentiner (1883–1949) a German U-boat commander during World War I
 Poul Schlüter (1929–2021) a Danish politician, Prime Minister of Denmark 1982–1993
 Jan Beyer Schmidt-Sørensen (born 1958) a Danish economist and former Director of Business Development at Aarhus Municipality

The Arts 

 Heinrich Wilhelm von Gerstenberg (1737–1823) a German poet and critic.
 Conrad Christian Bøhndel (1779 in Hostrup–1847) a Danish painter and lithographer
 Siegfried Saloman (1816 in Tønder–1899) a Danish violinist and composer
 Geskel Saloman (1821–1902) a Danish–Swedish portrait and genre painter
 Hans Wegner (1914–2017) Danish furniture designer

Sport 

 Henning Munk Jensen (born 1947) a Danish former association football player, played 392 games for AaB and 62 matches for Denmark 1966-1978, 24 of these as team captain
 Jakob Michelsen (born 1980) a Danish unattached football manager.

See also
 Concerning the Friary in Tønder

References

External links

 

Municipal seats of the Region of Southern Denmark
Municipal seats of Denmark
Cities and towns in the Region of Southern Denmark
Tønder Municipality